WJEQ (102.7 FM, "Classic 103") is a radio station broadcasting a classic rock format. Licensed to Macomb, Illinois, United States, the station is currently owned by Fletcher Ford, through licensee Virden Broadcasting Corp.

The station is an affiliate of the syndicated Floydian Slip Pink Floyd show.

References

External links

Classic rock radio stations in the United States
JEQ
McDonough County, Illinois
Radio stations established in 1983
1983 establishments in Illinois